The Mitsubishi 4J1 engine is a range of all-alloy straight-4 engines. The main goal was declared as reduction on-road CO2 emission on new vehicles. According to cars specifications fuel consumption also was improved. Comparing to previous engine series (4B1) valvetrain configuration was changed from DOHC to SOHC, Variable valve lift (VVL) technology added. The engine usually is paired with the ecological features like Start-Stop system and EGR. That engine mostly is appearing in the cars Lancer X, ASX, Outlander on several markets across Japan, Europe and Latin America.

4J10

Specifications

Applications
2013 Mitsubishi RVR (Japan)
2017 Mitsubishi Grand Lancer (Taiwan)
2015 Mitsubishi Lancer

Characteristics
The new 4J10 MIVEC engine features the use of a next-generation MIVEC system that continuously regulates intake valve lift, opening duration and timing. The new MIVEC system together with improved combustion stability and a reduction in piston friction provide an improvement in fuel economy without any loss in engine performance (output and torque) over the 4B10 MIVEC engine (1.8-liter, inline-4, 16-valve DOHC).

4J11

Specifications

Applications
2013-2016 Mitsubishi Outlander
2020-     Mitsubishi ASX

Characteristics
The 4J11 engine is the newly developed engine further improving the fuel economy. This engine can keep the same output performance as the conventional 4B11 engine by using the new MIVEC system.

4J12

Specifications

Applications
2016 Mitsubishi Outlander (Only vehicles for South Africa and Argentina)
2016 - 2020 Mitsubishi Outlander (ES, SE, LE, SEL Trims in United States and Puerto Rico)
2013 - 2017 Mitsubishi Outlander (Australia)

Characteristics
"Eco friendly" replacement for 4B12.

See also

 List of Mitsubishi engines

References

4J1
Straight-four engines
Gasoline engines by model